Marriageable Daughters (Swedish: Giftasvuxna döttrar) is a 1933 Swedish comedy film directed by Sigurd Wallén and starring Karin Swanström, Birgit Tengroth, Maritta Marke and Karin Ekelund. It was shot at the Råsunda Studios in Stockholm. The film's sets were designed by the art director Arne Åkermark. It is a remake of the 1925 German silent film Three Waiting Maids.

Synopsis
A maidservant takes an interest in the love lives of her three daughters who each in turn get married.

Cast
 Karin Swanström as 	Emma Lundberg
 Birgit Tengroth as 	Lotta
 Maritta Marke as 	Lina
 Karin Ekelund as 	Lena
 Sture Lagerwall as 	Robban
 Sigurd Wallén as Fritz Lande
 Einar Axelsson as 	Erik Ehrenberg
 Nils Jacobsson as 	Franz Hallberg
 Wiktor Andersson as 	Uncle Fredrik 
 Tor Borong as 	Door-man 
 Helga Brofeldt as 	Mrs. Bergstroem 
 Sigge Fürst as Dancing guest at restaurant

References

Bibliography 
 Qvist, Per Olov & von Bagh, Peter. Guide to the Cinema of Sweden and Finland. Greenwood Publishing Group, 2000.

External links 
 

1933 films
Swedish comedy films
1933 comedy films
1930s Swedish-language films
Films directed by Sigurd Wallén
Swedish black-and-white films
Remakes of German films
1930s Swedish films